A Touch of Tabasco is a 1959 studio album released by RCA Victor featuring the American jazz singer Rosemary Clooney and the Cuban band leader Perez Prado.

This was the only album that Clooney and Prado recorded together; the album was promoted with free bottles of Tabasco sauce.

The liner notes were contributed by Clooney's husband, the actor José Ferrer.

Track listing
 "Corazon de Melon" (Rigual, Traditional) - 2:06
 "Like a Woman" (Frank Loesser) - 2:06
 "I Only Have Eyes for You" (Al Dubin, Harry Warren) - 2:11
 "Magic Is the Moonlight" (Grever, Pasquale) - 2:39
 "In a Little Spanish Town" (Sam M. Lewis, Mabel Wayne, Victor Young) - 2:08
 "Sway" (Norman Gimbel, Luiz Ruiz) - 2:42
 "Mack the Knife" (Marc Blitzstein, Bertolt Brecht, Kurt Weill) - 2:03
 "Bali Ha'i" (Oscar Hammerstein II, Richard Rodgers) - 2:30
 "You Do Something to Me" (Cole Porter) - 1:36
 "Cucurrucucu Paloma" (Mendez) - 2:36
 "I Got Plenty o' Nuttin''" (George Gershwin, Ira Gershwin, DuBose Heyward) - 2:16
 "Adiós" (Madriguera, Woods) - 2:14

Personnel

Performance
 Rosemary Clooney – vocal
 Perez Prado – arranger, conductor

References

1959 albums
Rosemary Clooney albums
Pérez Prado albums
RCA Victor albums
Albums arranged by Pérez Prado
Albums conducted by Pérez Prado